Ghayal is a 1990 Indian Hindi-language action drama film directed by Rajkumar Santoshi (in his directorial debut) and produced by Dharmendra. The film stars Dharmendra's son Sunny Deol, Meenakshi Seshadri, Raj Babbar and Amrish Puri, with Moushumi Chatterjee, Annu Kapoor, Om Puri, Sharat Saxena and Sudesh Berry playing supporting roles. It was also the second highest-grossing film of the year.

The film received 8 nominations at the 36th Filmfare Awards, and won a leading 7 awards, including Best Film, Best Director for Santoshi and Best Actor for Deol. At the 38th National Film Awards, the film won the National Film Award for Best Popular Film Providing Wholesome Entertainment and Sunny Deol received the National Film Award – Special Mention. Ghayal was remade in Tamil as Bharathan in 1992, in Telugu as Gamyam in 1998 and in Kannada as Vishwa.

On 5 February 2016, a direct sequel titled Ghayal Once Again was released.

Plot

Amateur boxer Ajay Mehra (Sunny Deol) is living with his brother Ashok Mehra (Raj Babbar) and sister-in-law Indu Verma (Moushumi Chatterjee) in Mumbai. Ashok is a businessman who is facing some trouble at his company, but hides this from his wife and brother, Ajay. Later Ajay is sent to Bangalore for training.

Ajay gets a message that his brother is in Bangalore. When he reaches the hotel he finds that Ashok has already left without leaving any message for him. Later that day he receives a call from Ashok, who in an inebriated state, is trying to tell him something which has been troubling him for a long time but the phone cuts abruptly. When he returns from Bangalore, he finds that his brother is missing. His inquiries and a police complaint only lead him to frustration and violent outbursts. Some time later, he comes across Ashok's friend (Annu Kapoor), a drug addict, who reveals all the dark secrets.

Earlier when Ashok faced losses in his business, a reputed businessman Balwant Rai (Amrish Puri) had come to his rescue. Balwant becomes a partner in Ashok's company and settles all the debts. This arrangement is in fact a cover for Balwant's illegal activities. Balwant routinely traps honest people to provide cover for his illegal business and Ashok is one of his innocent victims. Initially when Ashok resists, Balwant threatens him of dire consequences, but Ashok persists with his requests to shut down illegal trade. Later, Ashok collects evidence to frame Balwant and that's where the trouble starts. Balwant kidnaps Ashok and tortures him to reveal where he has kept the evidence.

Somehow the henchmen of Balwant find out Ajay's knowledge of this incriminating evidence and Balwant instantly kills Ashok. Ajay is later framed for the murder and accused of having an illicit relationship with his sister-in-law. Ajay realises in court that the roots of evil are very deep and even his near ones have turned hostile towards him. His faith in the law is crushed and he seeks justice his own way. His sister-in-law is not able to bear the trauma and cruel comments of her neighbours and commits suicide.

While in jail, Ajay makes friends with some other hardcore convicts, who are good at heart. Then one day, they escape from the jail by overpowering the guards. Then begins Ajay's fight for justice, to take down Balwant Rai. One by one he takes down the cronies of Balwant who had framed him in the murder. Varsha is captured by Balwant, but Ajay rescues her and chases Balwant to an amusment park. He beats Balwant up before the police pull them apart and arrest Balwant. Varsha comes and embraces Ajay while slipping him a secret gun. In a form of poetic justice,  Ajay fatally shoots Balwant in front of people and police, who are meek witnesses. The film ends as Ajay is arrested.

Cast

Sunny Deol as Ajay Mehra
Meenakshi Seshadri as Varsha Sahay 
Raj Babbar as Ashok Mehra 
Moushumi Chatterjee as Indu Mehra
Amrish Puri as Balwant Rai
Om Puri as ACP Joe D'Souza
Kulbhushan Kharbanda as Police Commissioner Ashok Pradhan
Shabbir Khan as Vardha Rajan
Sudesh Berry as Rajan Berry
Annu Kapoor as Ashok's friend
Jack Gaud as Inspector Basheer Khan
Sharat Saxena as Captain Deka
Deep Dhillon as Inspector Sharma
Shafi Inamdar as Barrister Gupta
Ashalata Wabgaonkar as Ashok Pradhan's wife 
Viju Khote as Boxing Coach
Mitwa as Mitwa
Brahmachari as Mohile
Praveen Kumar as Bheemji (cameo)
Disco Shanti as dancer in the song "Pyasi Jawani Hai"

Soundtrack
The music was composed by Bappi Lahiri. A woeful version of the song is "Saath Hain Hum Sab Isse Badi Kya Khushi", sung independently and sedately by Kumar Sanu. Another song, "Mungda" rendered tersely in the film, originally occurs in the 1977 film Inkaar. Anjaan wrote all the songs except two versions of "Sochna Kya", which were penned by Indeevar.

Awards
38th National Film Awards:

 Best Popular Film Providing Wholesome Entertainment – Dharmendra
 National Film Award – Special Jury Award – Sunny Deol

36th Filmfare Awards:

Won

 Best Film – Dharmendra
 Best Director – Rajkumar Santoshi
Best Actor – Sunny Deol
 Best Story – Rajkumar Santoshi
 Best Art Director – Nitish Roy
 Best Cinematographer – Rajan Kothari
 Best Editor – V. N. Mayekar

Nominated
Best Supporting Actor – Om Puri

Remakes
Below is a table of the lead characters in the story of Ghayal and its remakes.

Trivia
The film's release clashed with that of Dil on the same day. Dil initially led, but Ghayal had a large repeat audience as Sunny Deol had become a famous action hero by 1991. It has rare feat of collecting more in the second week of its release than in the first week in the Mumbai circuit. By the end of its full run, Ghayal collected more than Dil in many circuits. However, Dil turned out to be the highest-grosser of the year, and Ghayal became the second highest-grosser of the year.

Originally, the film was offered to Mithun Chakraborty who had signed to play the lead. Dharmendra, who decided to produce the movie, personally asked Chakraborty if he could step down and allow Dharmendra's son Sunny Deol to feature in the film. Chakraborty did out of his friendship and respect for Dharmendra.

Sequel

A sequel named Ghayal Returns was announced in 2014. But before the film could enter production, it faced financial problems. However, Sunny Deol stated that he was determined to make the film. After once being stalled and then being postponed several times, the film was finally released with the title, Ghayal: Once Again, on 5 February 2016.

References

External links
 

1990 films
Films directed by Rajkumar Santoshi
1990s Hindi-language films
1990s action drama films
Indian action drama films
1990s vigilante films
Indian films about revenge
1990 directorial debut films
Indian courtroom films
Indian prison films
Films scored by Bappi Lahiri
Hindi films remade in other languages
Films set in Mumbai
Films set in Bangalore
Films shot in Mumbai
Films shot in Bangalore
Indian vigilante films
Best Popular Film Providing Wholesome Entertainment National Film Award winners
Films about organised crime in India
Vijayta Films films
Fictional portrayals of police departments in India
1990 drama films